Kofman is a surname. Notable people with the surname include:

 Bereck Kofman (1900–1943), French rabbi
 Boaz Kofman (born 1935), Israeli footballer
 Celina Kofman (1924–2020), Argentine human rights activist
 Galina Kofman, American computer scientist
 Jeffrey Kofman (born 1959), Canadian television journalist
 Michael Kofman, American military analyst
 Roman Kofman (born 1936), Ukrainian composer and conductor
 Sarah Kofman (1934–1994), French philosopher

See also 
 Kaufmann, surname
 Koffman, surname

Jewish surnames